Charlotte Quensel (born 1961) is a Swedish politician of the Sweden Democrats party and a member of the Riksdag.

Quensel has been a member of the Riksdag since 2018, and takes seat 303 for the constituency of Västra Götaland County. She sits on the Finance and EU Committees. In her role on the Finance Committee, Quensel has played a role in calling for changes in the laws over public sector procurement in response to reports of Swedish governments agencies working with companies blacklisted by the World Bank.

References 

1961 births
Living people
Members of the Riksdag 2018–2022
Women members of the Riksdag
Members of the Riksdag from the Sweden Democrats
Members of the Riksdag 2022–2026
21st-century Swedish politicians
21st-century Swedish women politicians